Stan Morcom (7 February 1936 – 2 March 1992) was  a former Australian rules footballer who played with Richmond in the Victorian Football League (VFL).

Notes

External links 		
		
		
		
		
		
		
		
1936 births		
1992 deaths		
Australian rules footballers from Victoria (Australia)		
Richmond Football Club players